Nodular goiter is an enlarged thyroid gland with bumps (nodules) on it. It is associated with both high and low activity of the gland.

 Toxic multinodular goitre, also known as multinodular toxic goiter (MNTG)
 Nontoxic nodular goiter